Techo Takhmao International Airport  is an international airport currently under construction in Kandal, Cambodia.
Once completed, it will be the ninth largest airport in the world and designated as a 4F class airport.

Etymology
The name Techo is a title given to army commanders by the King of Cambodia and Takhmao refers to the guardian spirit (Neakta) of Krong Takhmao which is the provincial city of Kandal province, the province in which the airport is located.

Prime Minister Hun Sen announced the new name on 9 December 2021 while inspecting the new airport. The word "Techo" is referenced from Khmer history in which the king granted titles to former Khmer army commanders Techo Meas and Techo Yort who operated in the territory of Kandal Province. He also stated that "Techo" shows the strength of the kingdom's monarchy.

See also 
 Phnom Penh International Airport
 List of airports in Cambodia
 List of airlines of Cambodia

References

Airports in Cambodia
Transport in Phnom Penh
Buildings and structures in Kandal province